Lou Harris (born January 1, 1950) is a former all-star Canadian Football League running back.

A graduate of USC, Harris played 4 seasons with the British Columbia Lions. His best year, his second, 1974 saw him rush for 1239 yards, 3rd best in the CFL. He was an all-star that year, and in rare double, his teammate Monroe Eley also rushed for over a thousand yards (1176) giving the Lions one of the best single season running games in CFL history. He ran for 958 yards in 1975 and 784 yards in 1976. He finished his career in Calgary in 1977.

References

1950 births
Living people
African-American players of Canadian football
American football running backs
BC Lions players
Calgary Stampeders players
Canadian football running backs
Players of Canadian football from Jackson, Mississippi
USC Trojans football players
21st-century African-American people
20th-century African-American sportspeople